Gajuri(Nepali: गजुरी ; gajuri) is a Gaupalika (Nepali: गाउपालिका ; gaupalika) (Formerly: village development committee) in Dhading District in the Bagmati Zone of central Nepal. It has a literacy rate of 64.28% (70.30% male and 58.41% female). The city hosts as one of the city with highest literacy rate in the Dhading district. The local body was formed by merging three VDCs namely Gajuri, Pida, Nepal, Kiranchok.

At the time of the 2011 Nepal census it had a population of 10,035 including 4,968 males and 5,067 females, being one of the most populated city in the district. The average household size was 4.51. Besides, it had 2,223 houses in this area. According to the report, out of 2,223 houses, around 1,884 had at least one facility like Radio, Television, Internet, etc.

During the collection of voters data for 2017 Nepalese local elections, the population of Gajuri was calculated to be 27,084.

Rural Municipality
Gajuri was declared as Rural Municipality on March 10, 2017. The formation of Rural Municipality led to local level elections on May 14, 2017. Out of a population of 27,084, there were 14,169 total eligible voters. CPN (UML) won positions for both Chairperson and Vice-Chairperson with a vote count of 4,336 and 4,214 respectively.

Transportation 
Gajuri is connected to Kathmandu to the east and Malekhu to the west by Prithvi Highway.

Geography 
Gajuri lies at the North-Western part of Dhading District to the south of Trishuli River and covers an area of 138.66 km2. The average altitude of Gajuri is 547 metres (1796 ft) above sea level.

Demographics  
Per 2011 Census, the total population of Gajuri was 10,035 out of which 4,968 were male and 5,067 female in 2,223 households.
Average family size was 4.51

Population

By Age

By Literacy Rate

By Caste

Hospitals
 Gajuri Primary Health Centre 
 Gajuri Hospital Pvt. Ltd

Schools
 Shree Adarsha Higher Secondary School
 Munal Academy
 Jagadamba Boarding School
 Pawil Himal Academy

College
 Adarsha Multiple Campus

Bank/ATM
 राष्ट्रिय वाणिज्य बैंक
 प्रभु बैंक लिमिटेड
 कृषि विकास बैंक लिमिटेड
 एनआइसी एसिया बैंक
 नबिल बैंक
 माछापुच्छे बैंक लिमिटेड

 National Banijya Bank
 Prabhu Bank Limited
 Krishi Vikas Bank Limited
 NIC Asia Bank
 Nabil Bank
 Machhapuchhe Bank Limited

See also

Dhading District

References

Populated places in Dhading District
Rural municipalities in Dhading District
Rural municipalities of Nepal established in 2017